Six ships of the Royal Navy have borne the name HMS Modeste:

  was a 64-gun third rate, previously the French Modeste. She was captured in 1759, used for harbour service from 1778 and was broken up in 1800.
  was a 36-gun fifth rate, previously the French Modeste. She was captured in 1793, used as a floating battery from 1804 and was broken up in August 1814.
 HMS Modeste was a 38-gun fifth rate, previously the French Terpsichore. She was captured in 1814 but never commissioned, and was broken up in 1816.
  was an 18-gun sloop launched in 1837 and sold in 1866.
  was a wooden screw corvette launched in 1873 and sold in 1888.
  was a modified Black Swan-class sloop launched in 1944 and sold in 1961.

Royal Navy ship names